Katherine Lewis Scanlon (born August 25, 1970) is an American rower. In the 1995 World Rowing Championships, she won a gold medal in the women's coxless four event. She also won silver medals in both the 1993 and 1994 World Rowing Championships in the women's eight event.

References

See also

American female rowers
World Rowing Championships medalists for the United States
Living people
1970 births
21st-century American women